Pi Alpha Xi is a national honor society for horticulture founded in 1923 at Cornell University.

History

Symbols
The name Pi Alpha Xi comes from:
Pi – the first letter of polumathia, or scholarship;
Alpha - from the word anthemorgous, meaning to work with plants;
Xi – for zunoia, signifying the bond among gardeners, educators and professional horticulturists.

Symbols include the Stylus, the Nile Lotus, the Egyptian hoe and the Ancient vase.

Chapters
Roster of Chapters:

Alpha – Cornell University, chartered June 1, 1923
Beta – University of Illinois at Urbana–Champaign, chartered April 2, 1924
Gamma – Penn State University, chartered May 29, 1926
Delta – Michigan State University, chartered April 12, 1929
Epsilon – Ohio State University, chartered January 6, 1929
Zeta – Rutgers University, chartered November 16, 1933
Eta – Washington State University, chartered March 12, 1949
Theta – University of Maryland, chartered September 14, 1949
Iota – North Carolina State University, chartered February 15, 1957
Kappa – Virginia Polytechnic & State University, chartered June 1, 1968
Lambda – University of Minnesota, chartered May 28, 1968
Mu – University of Florida, chartered May 16, 1974
Nu – Auburn University, chartered May 30, 1974
Xi – New Mexico State University, chartered December 1, 1974
Omicron – Purdue University, chartered February 23, 1975
Pi – Clemson University, chartered April 17, 1975
Rho – University of Wisconsin–Madison, chartered March 1, 1975
Sigma – Southern Illinois University, chartered April 2, 1975
Tau – University of Georgia, chartered May 30, 1975
Upsilon – California Polytechnic State University, chartered September 1, 1975
Phi – South Dakota State University, chartered October 29, 1975
Chi – Colorado State University, chartered May 29, 1975
Psi – Texas A&M University, chartered May 31, 1978
Omega – Kansas State University, chartered March 16, 1979
Alpha Beta – University of Tennessee, chartered May 26, 1980
Alpha Gamma – University of Nebraska–Lincoln, chartered April 23, 1982
Alpha Delta – Oklahoma State University, chartered April 24, 1983
Alpha Epsilon – University of California, Davis, chartered Spring 1984
Alpha Zeta – University of Wisconsin–River Falls, chartered May 16, 1985
Alpha Eta – Delaware Valley University, chartered Spring 1985
Alpha Theta – Iowa State University, chartered November 6, 1986
Alpha Iota – Texas Tech University, chartered March 24, 1988
Alpha Kappa – Mississippi State University, chartered Spring 1990
Alpha Lambda – Florida A&M University, chartered February 1, 1992
Alpha Mu – Temple University, chartered Spring 1992
Alpha Nu – Utah State University, chartered June 2, 1995
Alpha Xi – Texas State University, chartered April 18, 2005
Alpha Omicron – University of Arkansas, chartered May 2, 2006
Alpha Pi – University of Wisconsin–Platteville, chartered May 4, 2006
Alpha Rho – Oregon State University, chartered 2011
Alpha Sigma – University of Wyoming, chartered October 13, 2015
Alpha Tau – University of Maine, chartered September 21, 2015

References

Horticultural organizations based in the United States
Honor societies
Student organizations established in 1923
1923 establishments in New York (state)